Topal is a Turkish word meaning "lame" and may refer to:

Surnames of contemporary people
 Hakan Topal (born 1972), Turkish-American artist
 Mehmet Topal (born 1986), Turkish football player
 Mehmet Can Topal, Turkish judoka with Down syndrome
 Murat Topal (born 1976), Turkish-Austrian futsal player
 Stepan Topal (born 1938), Gagauz politician from Moldova who served as Governor of Gagauzia from 1990 to 1995
 Turan Topal, Turkish Christian convert, who went on trial in 2006 for crimes against "Turkishness" and Islam

Epithets of historical Ottoman people
 Topal Osman Agha, a colonel of the late Ottoman Empire and early Republic of Turkey
 Darendeli Topal İzzet Mehmed Pasha, a Grand Vizier and Kapudan Pasha of the Ottoman Empire
 Topal Osman Pasha, a Grand Vizier in the Ottoman Empire
 Topal Recep Pasha, a Grand Vizier in the Ottoman Empire
 Topal Sulayman Pasha, an Ottoman ruler of Damascus
 Topal Yusuf Pasha, an Ottoman ruler of Damascus

Epithets of historical Bosnian rulers
 Topal Hasan-paša, a ruler of Bosnia
 Gazi Topal Husein-paša, a ruler of Bosnia
 Šerif Topal Osman-paša, a ruler of Bosnia

See also 
 Topol (surname), a Polish/Russian/Jewish surname of different lineage than those of Turkish origin

Turkish-language surnames